The 2012 New Progressive Party primaries were the primary elections by which voters of the New Progressive Party (PNP) chose its nominees for various political offices of Puerto Rico for the 2012 general elections. They were held on March 18, 2012 and coincided with the Republican Party primaries in the island.

Background

At the time of the primaries, the New Progressive Party had already chosen current Governor Luis Fortuño, as their gubernatorial candidate for reelection. He would be joined again in the ballot by current Resident Commissioner Pedro Pierluisi. There was the possibility for a primary between Fortuño and aspiring candidate Iván González Cancel, but he wasn't certified by the Commission. González appealed the decision in the courts, but the case was still pending at the time of the primaries.

In the Senate, there were 14 sitting senators looking to retain their election spots. In the House, there were around 6 sitting at-large representatives as well. Also, some returning candidates from previous years, like Carlos Díaz, and other former officeholders, like María Milagros Charbonier and Zoé Laboy, were entering the political race. Current representative Liza M. Fernández was running for a Senate seat this time, while her husband, Angel Pérez, was running for a representative seat in District 6.

Sitting representative Cristóbal Colón Ruíz was also looking to gain an election spot to be mayor of Patillas, against sitting mayor Benjamín Cintrón. There were fifteen sitting mayor from the PNP that were challenged in primaries.

Also, the amount of primaries per municipality and districts were few, when compared to previous years. As a result, the primaries were expected to be of low participation among the party members.

Candidates

Senate

At-large

 Lucy Arce
 Héctor Morales
 Margarita Nolasco
 Itzamar Peña

 Kimmey Raschke
 Thomas Rivera Schatz
 Melinda Romero
 Larry Seilhamer

District
The New Progressive Party held primaries on 5 of the 8 senatorial districts.

San Juan
 Eddie Charbonier
 Liza M. Fernández
 Zoé Laboy

Arecibo
 Edgardo "Eggie" Centeno
 José Emilio González Velázquez
 Juan Miguel Guzmán
 Angel Martínez Santiago
 José "Joito" Pérez
 Elaine "Tuti" Soler

Mayagüez-Aguadilla
 Frank Hernández
 Luis Daniel Muñiz Cortes
 Alfredo Ocasio
 Evelyn Vázquez
 Benjamín "Bengie" Velázquez

Guayama
 Osvaldo Colón Reyes
 William "Willie" Jiménez
 Miguelito Rodríguez
 Marangely Sáez
 Carlos J. Torres Torres

Humacao
 Juan Bautista
 José R. Díaz Hernández
 Alexis Quiñones
 Luz M. Santiago González

House of Representatives

At-large

Néstor Alonso
José Aponte
José Chico
Jennifer González
Jorge Irizarry

José E. Meléndez Ortíz
María Milagros Charbonier
Yumary Peña
Lourdes Ramos
José "Pichy" Torres Zamora

District
The New Progressive Party held primaries on 18 of the 40 representative districts.

District 4
 Carlos Díaz
 Víctor Parés

District 6
 Angel Pérez Otero
 Antonio "Tony" Soto

District 11
 José "Cano" Montes
 María Vega Pagán

District 14
 Ricardo Llerandi
 Paula Rodríguez Homs

District 16
 Eric Alfaro Calero
 Armando Nieves

District 18
 David Bonilla Cortés
 Angel Muñoz
 Alejandro Torres Babilonia

District 19
 Rafael Beauchamp
 Manuel Feliciano
 Orlando "Pochy" Orta
 Juan Alberto Zapata

District 21
 Noel Morales, Jr.
 Ramoncito Ramos

District 22
 Exel López
 Luis Maldonado
 Waldemar Quiles

District 25
 Roberto González Rosa
 Luis Mercado Fraticelli
 Luis Armando Rivera

District 26
 Urayoán Hernández
 José Luis Jiménez

District 29
 Carlos Junior Aponte
 Adalberto Reyes

District 31
 John Corales
 Roberto López

District 32
 José R. Camino
 Orlando Rivera
 Rafael Uceta

District 34
 Félix "Johnny" Figueroa
 José Iván Medina
 Pickie Díaz

District 35
 Ciary Pérez
 Reinaldo Vargas

District 38
 Eric Correa
 Israel Matos Vázquez

District 40
 Angel Camacho
 Elizabeth Casado

Mayors
The New Progressive Party held primaries in 24 of 78 municipalities.

Aguada
 Luis "Berty" Echevarría
 Manuel Santiago

Arecibo
 Carlos Molina
 Lemuel Soto

Cabo Rojo
 Perza Rodríguez
 José "Chiquin" Morales

Cayey
 Wilson Colón
 Omar Vázquez

Ceiba
 Pedro Colón Osorio
 Angelo Cruz

Cidra
 Javier Carrasquillo
 Pedro "Banchy" Cintrón

Culebra
 Emerito Amaro
 Ricardo López

Florida
 Julio "Kosovo" Carrión
 José Gerena Polanco
 Aarón Pargas

Guayanilla
 Janice González
 Julissa Nolasco

Hormigueros
 Augustine "Chito" Olivencia
 José "Joe" Rodríguez

Humacao
 Julio César López
 Lucrecia Ortíz

Isabela
 Gabriel Machado
 Juvencio "Papo" Méndez
 José Sotomayor

Jayuya
 Roberto Pagán Crespí
 Luis Ernesto Torres

Loíza
 Ferdín Carrasquillo
 Eddie Manso

Luquillo
 Eva Benabe Torrens
 José "Nelo" González
 David Pizarro Rivera

Manatí
 Juan Aubín Cruz Manzano
 José Sánchez

Naguabo
 Noé Marcano
 Maritza Meléndez

Patillas
 Benjamín Cintrón
 Cristóbal Colón Ruíz

Rincón

Salinas
 Basilio "Cholito" Baerga
 Carlos Rodríguez Mateo

San Sebastián
 Joselly González
 Javier Jiménez

Toa Alta
 Luis "Jumbo" Collazo
 Luis Visaldén

Utuado
 Héctor "Tito" Camacho
 Doris Nilda González
 Juan Lamboy
 José "Junior" Pagán
 Jorgito Pérez

Vega Baja
 José Galán
 Iván Hernández González

Results

Senate

At-large

District

San Juan

Arecibo

Mayagüez-Aguadilla

Guayama

Humacao

House of Representatives

At-large

District

Aftermath

Allegations of fraud

On the same day of the primaries, PPD Electoral Commissioner Eder Ortíz, claimed he had evidence of fraud from the PNP primaries.

Sitting senators losing

Senators Evelyn Vázquez (District IV) and José Emilio González (District III) had their candidatures at risk. Vázquez win over Benjamín Velázquez was close and could go to a recount, while José Emilio González claimed there were irregularities that could have led to his loss.

Representative District 6
There was a lot of controversy surrounding the primaries for the House of Representatives District 6. Both candidates, Angel Pérez and Antonio Soto, have exchanged leads and have been announced as winners after different vote counts. Pérez, who had initially appeared as the loser, claimed there was fraud in the election, and accused Guaynabo mayor, Héctor O'Neill, of orchestrating it. When Pérez was announced as the real winner, O'Neill, who supported Pagán's rival, went into a rant on a radio interview against his own party.

Incumbent mayors losses

Several sitting mayors from the PNP lost their candidacies for the elections. Some of them were Benjamín Cintrón (from Patillas), Lemuel Soto (Arecibo), and Maritza Meléndez (Naguabo).

See also

Popular Democratic Party primaries, 2012

References

External links
Comisión Estatal de Elecciones

Primary elections in Puerto Rico
2012 Puerto Rico elections
New Progressive Party (Puerto Rico)